Thomas Henry Robson (31 July 1944 – 8 October 2020) was an English footballer who made more than 600 appearances in the Football League playing as a left winger.

Life and career
Robson was born in Gateshead. He played for Newcastle United as a junior, but was released and joined Northampton Town as a 15-year-old. He represented England at youth level, and went on to play for Chelsea before returning to Newcastle United. In 1968, he joined Peterborough United. Robson served the club for 13 years, becoming their all-time record appearance-maker with 482 league matches played, before leaving League football for Nuneaton Borough and Stamford. On 4 October 2008, Robson became the first ever inductee to the Peterborough United Hall of Fame.

In September 2019, Robson revealed that he had been diagnosed with motor neurone disease. He died in Peterborough City Hospital on 8 October 2020, aged 76 following his battle with MND.

References

External links
 Player profile at Toon1892.com

1944 births
2020 deaths
Footballers from Gateshead
English footballers
England youth international footballers
Association football wingers
Northampton Town F.C. players
Newcastle United F.C. players
Chelsea F.C. players
Peterborough United F.C. players
Nuneaton Borough F.C. players
Stamford A.F.C. players
English Football League players
National League (English football) players
Deaths from motor neuron disease
Neurological disease deaths in England